Vicente Guerrero is a colonia located in the San Quintin Valley, Baja California, Mexico. Vicente Geurero experiences a desert climate, and is close to the beach. There are ruins of old missions in the surrounding areas. 

Populated places in Baja California